The South Africa cricket team toured Sri Lanka in July and August 2018 to play two Tests, five One Day Internationals (ODIs) and a Twenty20 International (T20I) match. Originally, the tour was for three Test matches, but the third match was dropped and replaced by the ODI and T20I fixtures. The extra ODI fixtures were used as preparation for the 2019 Cricket World Cup.

Ahead of the tour, Sri Lanka Cricket (SLC) named Dinesh Chandimal as the captain of the Test side. However, Chandimal faced disciplinary charges, for his role in alleged ball-tampering during the second Test against the West Indies in Saint Lucia in June 2018. His hearing took place before the start of the first Test, with him found guilty. He received a two-match ban, with Suranga Lakmal captaining the side in his place. After the conclusion of the first Test, the independent Judicial Commissioner handed down a further eight suspension points to Chandimal, meaning that he was also suspended for the first four ODIs of the series.

Sri Lanka won the Test series 2–0.

During the ODI series, South Africa's captain, Faf du Plessis, injured himself during the third match and was ruled out of the rest of the tour, including the one-off T20I fixture. Quinton de Kock was named as the captain of South Africa for the last two ODIs of the series. JP Duminy was also named as the captain of the team for the T20I match. South Africa won the ODI series 3–2. Sri Lanka won the one-off T20I match by three wickets.

Squads

Sri Lanka named Dimuth Karunaratne, Nishan Peiris, Isuru Udana and Jeffrey Vandersay as standby players for the ODI series. The day before the one-off T20I fixture, Isuru Udana and Kasun Rajitha were added to Sri Lanka's squad for the match.

Tour matches

Two-day match: Sri Lanka Board XI vs South Africa

One-day match: Sri Lanka Board XI vs South Africa

Test series

1st Test

2nd Test

ODI series

1st ODI

2nd ODI

3rd ODI

4th ODI

5th ODI

T20I series

Only T20I

Notes

References

External links
 Series home at ESPN Cricinfo

2018 in South African cricket
2018 in Sri Lankan cricket
International cricket competitions in 2018
South African cricket tours of Sri Lanka